The table below lists the reasons delivered from the bench by the Supreme Court of Canada during 2002. The table illustrates what reasons were filed by each justice in each case, and which justices joined each reason. This list, however, does not include decisions on motions.

Of the 86 judgments released in 2002, 10 were oral, 56 were unanimous, and none were motions.

Judgments and reasons

Justices of the Supreme Court

Table key

References

External links
 2002 decisions: CanLII LexUM

Reasons Of The Supreme Court Of Canada, 2002
Supreme Court of Canada reasons by year